Chittagong Medical University  is a government medical university situated in Chattogram, Bangladesh. It was established in 2016. This is a Government Medical University.

History
  
In the 2016, the law of establishing Chittagong Medical University was enacted in 17th of the law. Then all the procedures for establishing medical universities started. On 17 May 2017, the recruitment process of VC officially started. In the continuation of his (017-18-18) academic year, MBBS students are admitted under Chittagong Medical University. These students were earlier admitted under Chittagong University.

List of vice-chancellors 

 Md. Ismile Khan

Faculties
1. Faculty of Medicine, Present Dean- Professor Dr. Shahena Akter

2. Faculty of Nursing & IHT (Institute of Health Technology), Present Dean- Prof. Dr.
Mohammed Monowar-Ul-Haque

References 

Universities and colleges in Chittagong
Educational institutions established in 2017
2017 establishments in Bangladesh
Public Medical University of Bangladesh
Medical universities in Bangladesh